Leroy Township may refer to the following places in the U.S. state of Michigan:

 Leroy Township, Calhoun County, Michigan
 Leroy Township, Ingham County, Michigan
 LeRoy Township, Michigan in Osceola County

See also 
 Leroy, Presque Isle County, Michigan, unincorporated community in Krakow Township
 LeRoy, Michigan, village and post office in Osceola County
 Leroy Township (disambiguation)

Michigan township disambiguation pages